Midob (also spelt Meidob) is the language of the Midob people of North Darfur, Sudan. It is one of the Nubian languages, which are part of the Nilo-Saharan language phylum.

Apart from in their homeland of Malha, North Darfur, Midob speakers also live in the Khartoum area (primarily in Omdurman and the Gezira region) and Jezirat Aba. The Midob people call their language tìd-n-áal, literally "mouth of the Midob", and themselves tìddí (singular), tìd (plural). There are an estimated 50,000 Midob speakers in two main dialects, Urrti and Kaageddi. Rilly (2010:162) lists the dialects of Urrti, Shalkota, and  Torti. Only Urrti has been described in detail.

Recent research on Midob has been done by Thelwall (1983) and Werner (1993). Both studies concerned the Urrti dialect.

Phonology
The following tables show the phonological consonants and vowels without phonetic variations and without more recent Arabic loans.

Vowels

Note: All vowels occur long and short. The mid central vowel ə only appears in Midob, not in other Nubian languages.

Consonants

Tone

Midob is a tonal language with two registers: High and Low. Tone is both lexical and grammatical.

Grammar
Midob is an agglutinative language, like the other Nubian languages. The default word order is SOV.

Verb
The verbs consist of: 
verbal stem ( + extension ) + tense/aspect.
The stem is not altered. Extensions modify or add meaning to the verb like negation, intention, affirmation, completed action, plurality of subject–object or action, durative, habitual and sometimes can be combined (especially negation).

Tense and aspect 
Midob has two basic tenses (Perfect and Continuous) plus Intentional. There are sets of suffixes for indicative, subjunctive and two question forms (to ask for a fact, i.e. "When/Why..." and to verify a fact, i.e. "Did you...").

Sets of personal endings:

References

Werner, Roland (1993) 'Tìdn-áal: A Study of Midob (Darfur-Nubian)' Berlin: Dietrich Reimer.
Thelwall, Robin (1983) 'Meidob Nubian: Phonology, Grammatical Notes and Basic Vocabulary' in Bender, M. L. (Ed), Nilo-Saharan Language Studies, V.13, East Lansing

External links
 Midob from mille langues blog
 Midob Material from the Research of Roland Werner

Nubian languages
Languages of Sudan